The Bắc Giang  is a left tributary of the Kỳ Cùng River. It is 114 km long with a catchment area of 2670 km2 and flows through Lạng Sơn Province and Bắc Kạn Province in northeastern Vietnam. The river originates in  Bắc Sơn District in Lạng Sơn Provinceand flows in a northwesterly direction.

External links
Map of northeastern Vietnam showing rivers

Rivers of Lạng Sơn province
Rivers of Bắc Kạn province
Rivers of Vietnam